Old Basford is an area of Nottingham located next to New Basford being split by Valley Road/Western Boulevard. The parish church of St Leodegarius was built in the 12th century. The north aisle and north arcade were rebuilt in 1858–59 and the church restored, except for the tower. The church tower collapsed in 1859 and was rebuilt in 1859–61. Near the church is the Manor House of  1700.

See also
St Leodegarius Church, Basford

References

An actual citizen of the area.

Areas of Nottingham